Novate Mezzola is a comune (municipality) in the Province of Sondrio in the Italian region Lombardy, located about  north of Milan and about  west of Sondrio, on the border with Switzerland.

Novate Mezzola borders the following municipalities: Bondo (Switzerland), Cercino, Cino, Civo, Dubino, Mello, Piuro, Prata Camportaccio, Samolaco, Sorico, Traona, Val Masino, Verceia, Villa di Chiavenna.

Demographic evolution

References

External links
 www.comune.novatemezzola.so.it

Cities and towns in Lombardy